Uli Waas (born 1949, in Donauwörth) is a German writer and illustrator. She has illustrated several school and children's books.

She studied Graphic design and Fine Arts at the Academy of Fine Arts, Munich.

Books for children and teenagers
 Bärenjahr. Basteln, kochen, spielen - Ideen für 12 Monate. Carlsen Verlag, Reinbek 1988
 Bratapfel und Laterne. Ausgesuchte Lieder, Rätsel, Gedichte. Carlsen Verlag, Hamburg 1989
 Fröhlicher Advent. Ausgesuchte Lieder, Rätsel, Gedichte. Carlsen Verlag, Hamburg 1989
 Mia Maus feiert Geburtstag. Carlsen Verlag, Hamburg 1990
 Mia Maus Hat Ferien. Carlsen Verlag, Hamburg 1990
 Mia Maus im Kindergarten. Carlsen Verlag, Hamburg 1990
 Mia Maus ist krank. Carlsen Verlag, Hamburg 1990
 Winter-Allerlei. Lieder, Rätsel, Gedichte. Carlsen Verlag, Hamburg 1991
 Molly ist weg. Eine wahre Hundegeschichte. Reihe: Ich lese selber. Nord-Süd Verlag, Gossau Zürich 1993
 Ich schmücke meinen Weihnachtsbaum. Mit Spielelementen zum Herausnehmen. Ed. Bücherbär, Würzburg 2003
 Komm mit nach Bethlehem. Adventskalender. Coppenrath Verlag, Münster 2002
 Bescherung im Wald. Coppenrath Verlag, Münster 2003
 Die Tiere schmücken den Weihnachtsbaum. Coppenrath Verlag, Münster 2004
 Julia ruft 112. Eine Feriengeschichte. Kinderbrücke, Weiler i.A. 2004
 1-1-2, Hilfe kommt herbei. Hilfe holen mit der Notrufnummer. Ed. Bücherbär, Würzburg 2005
 Bescherung mit Engelschlitten. Coppenrath Verlag, Münster 2007

External links and references

Living people
German illustrators
German women illustrators
20th-century German women writers
21st-century German women writers
1949 births
German women children's writers